The Yazidi Book of Revelation is the title of a Kurdish book which is assumed to be one of two sacred books of Yazidis, the other being the Yazidi Black Book. However, the authenticity of its sacredness has not been confirmed. The book claims to be the words of Melek Taus wherein he allocates the different responsibilities, blessings and misfortunes as he desires and which humans have no say in.

Discovery and authenticity 
Shaykh ʿAbdallāh al-Ratabkī (d. 1746) mentioned a sacred Yazidi text called Jilwa and he ascribed its authorship to Sheikh Adi ibn Musafir. This was echoed by R. H. W. Empson in 1928 who moreover stated that the book was written by Sheikh Adi to Fakhr ad-Din ibn Adi. R. Frank, however, in his discussion of the Jilwa in 1911, denied this.

When foreigners began studying Yazidis in the 1850s, they believed that the Yazidis had sacred books and thus tried to find them. While Yazidis do have sacred books as attested in their oral traditions, it was not known whether they were kept secret in a Yazidi home or burned during massacres. Copies of the Yazidi Book of Revelation were found in the 1880s and a number of copies purporting to be authentic circulated in Iraq from the late 19th century to the early 20th century. Assyrian Jeremiah Shamir, a former monk and known manuscript dealer from Ankawa was seemingly implicated in this affair. A translation of the Yazidi Book of Revelation and Yazidi Black Book was translated by Alpheus Andrus in 1891, and later by Edward Granville Browne in 1895. Translations were also made by R. Y. Ebied, M. J. L. Young and Isya Joseph. Joseph claimed that his translation was made from the original Kurdish book which he had discovered. Alphonse Mingana asserted in 1916 that all hitherto translations were based on inauthentic documents. He moreover states that Shamir could have been the author of the Yazidi Book of Revelation.

Yazidis themselves knew of the books before Western interest that began in the 1850s, but the vast majority of them had never seen them.

Content 
The book is written in first-person narrative with a narrator that speaks as a supreme being and begins with a short introduction followed by five chapters.

References 

Yazidi texts
Religion in Kurdistan
Religious books